Night Taxi (Italian: Taxi di notte) is a 1950 French-Italian comedy film about a taxicab driver, directed by Carmine Gallone and starring Beniamino Gigli, Danielle Godet and Philippe Lemaire. After finding a baby left abandoned in his cab, a singing taxi driver tries to find its mother.

Cast
Beniamino Gigli	as	Nello Spadoni
Danielle Godet	as	Laura Morani
Philippe Lemaire	as	Alberto Franchi
Virginia Belmont	as	Luisa Forenti
Carlo Ninchi	as	Forenti l'Industriale
William Tubbs	as	Mr. William Simon
Jone Morino	as	Signora Forenti
Aroldo Tieri	as	Conte Tattini
Giuseppe Varni	as	Major Domo
Giuseppe Rinaldi	as	Il raggionere, inamorato di Luisa
Renzo De Luca	as	Il piccolo abandonato in taxi
Giulio Battiferri
Franco Coop
Peppino Spadaro
 Edda Soligo 
 Ciro Berardi 
 Gustavo Serena 
 Nico Pepe 
 Pina Piovani

References

Bibliography
 Aprà, Adriano. The Fabulous Thirties: Italian cinema 1929-1944. Electa International, 1979.

External links
 

1950 films
French comedy films
Italian comedy films
1950s Italian-language films
1950 comedy films
Films directed by Carmine Gallone
French black-and-white films
Italian black-and-white films
1950s French films
1950s Italian films